The 14 Fighter Division is a fighter aircraft unit of the Chinese People's Liberation Army Air Force (PLAAF).  

It was formed in February 1951 at Beijing Nanyuan Airport from elements of the disbanding 95th Division. Stationed at Nanchang, Jiangxi. The division fought in Korea, as a mixed MiG-9/MiG-15 fighter unit. Started its second combat tour in April 1953 and ceased combat in July 1953. It appears that in September 1992 the 146th Regiment of the disbanding 49th Air Division may have become the 42nd Regiment.

The 14th Fighter Division is composed of:
 40th Regiment Nanchang/Xiangtang (J11; Su-27UBK)
 41st Regiment Wuyishan
 42nd Regiment Zhangshu (J7E)

References

Aviation Divisions of the People's Liberation Army
Military units and formations established in 1951
1951 establishments in China